Romain Sort is a French rugby league footballer who represented France at the 2000 World Cup.

Playing career
In 1997 Sort was part of the Paris Saint-Germain Rugby League which played in Super League II. He later played for the Villeneuve Leopards.

He made his debut for France in 1998 against Ireland. In 2000 he was named as part of the French squad for the 2000 World Cup and went on to play in three matches in the tournament. He toured New Zealand and Papua New Guinea in 2001, finishing his career having played in 15 matches for France.

References

1974 births
Living people
French rugby league players
France national rugby league team players
Paris Saint-Germain Rugby League players
Rugby league props
Rugby league second-rows
Villeneuve Leopards players